List of urban planners chronological by initial year of plan.
 c. 332 BC Dinocrates – Alexandria, Egypt
 c. 408 BC Hippodamus of Miletus – Piraeus (port of Athens), Thurii, Rhodes
 330-336 CE Constantine – Byzantium replanned and rebuilt as the city of Constantinople
 c. 413 – Flavius Anthemius – Theodosian Walls
 c. 527-565 – Constantinople replanned under Justinian after the Nika riots, under the supervision of architects including Isidore of Miletus and Anthemius of Tralles. City replanned around the Sacred Palace, the Hagia Sophia, and the Basilica Cistern, rather than Augusteum. 
 c. 1453 – Constantinople rebuilt as an Ottoman capital by Mehmed the Conqueror, Atik Sinan,  and other Ottoman architects, with additions including the Grand Bazaar, the Fatih Mosque, the Imperial Arsenal, and the Sublime Porte at the new Topkapı Palace.
 c. 1509 – Constantinople replanned again following the 1509 Constantinople earthquake by Selim I and his brother Şehzade Ahmet, during the reign of their father, Bayezid II. 
 c. 1450 AD Nezahualcoyotl – Texcoco (altepetl), Aztec Mexico
 c. 1590 Tokugawa Ieyasu, Tokugawa Hidetada, Tokugawa Iemitsu, Takatora Todo – Edo, later Tokyo, Japan 
 1598 Sheikh Baha ad-Din – Isfahan
 1666 Christopher Wren – London
 1681 Johan Caspar von Cicignon – Trondheim
 1682 William Penn and Thomas Holme – Philadelphia
 1727 Maharaja Jai Singh II – astronomer, city planner, Jaipur, Rajasthan, India
 1791 Peter Charles L'Enfant and Andrew Ellicott – Washington, D.C.
 1805 Augustus B. Woodward – Detroit
 1811 Gouverneur Morris, John Rutherfurd, and Simeon De Witt – Commissioners' Plan of New York City
 c. 1838 Joseph Smith and later Brigham Young – several Mormon settlements including Nauvoo, Illinois and Salt Lake City
 1853 Georges-Eugène Haussmann – responsible for the broad avenues of Paris 
 1859 Ildefons Cerdà – planner of the Eixample district of Barcelona
 1862 James Hobrecht – Hobrecht-Plan for Berlin
 c. 1880 Solon Spencer Beman and George Pullman – Pullman, Chicago
 1880 Pedro Benoit – La Plata, Argentina
 1882 Arturo Soria y Mata – the Ciudad Lineal, Madrid
 1898 Ebenezer Howard – Garden city movement
 1901 Charles Follen McKim – Washington, D.C. revised plan
 1909 Daniel Burnham – Chicago
 1912 Walter Burley Griffin – Canberra
 1912 Johan Albrecht Ehrenström – Helsinki 
 1915 Alfred Bettman
 1920-1932 Richard Kauffmann – Haifa, Ramat Gan, Afula, Herzliya, Jerusalem
 1924 Andrew R. Cobb and Thomas Adams – Corner Brook, Newfoundland
 1924 Clarence Stein – Sunnyside Gardens, Queens, New York; Chatham Village, Pittsburgh; Baldwin Hills Village, Los Angeles
 1925 Ernst May – city plan and housing units in Frankfurt, Germany, including Siedlung Römerstadt
 1927–1929 Patrick Geddes – Tel Aviv
 1927 Bruno Taut – Hufeisensiedlung (Horseshoe Projects), Berlin
 1928 Henry Wright – Radburn, New Jersey
 c. 1930 Robert Moses – responsible for the urban renewal of New York City
 1930 Ernst May – Magnitogorsk and some 20 other urban projects in the Soviet Union
 1932 Hermann Jansen – Ankara, Türkiye 
 1935 Frank Lloyd Wright – Broadacre City (concept)
 1935–1981 Eldridge Lovelace – many US cities
 1938 Donald Gibson – Coventry, England
 1942 Arthur Korn and Felix Samuely – MARS plan for London
 1950 Le Corbusier – Chandigarh, India
 1955 Stanley Wardley – Bradford, Yorkshire, England
 1957 Lúcio Costa – Brasília, Brazil
 1958 Ludwig Mies van der Rohe, Ludwig Hilberseimer, Alfred Caldwell – Lafayette Park, Detroit
 1960 Edmund Bacon – engaged in the redevelopment of parts of Philadelphia
 1960 William Pereira – Irvine, California
 1960 Konstantinos Doxiadis – Islamabad, Pakistan
 1963 Dariush Borbor – Tehran, Iran
 1963 Mort Hoppenfeld, James Rouse – Columbia, Maryland
 1964 Jaime Lerner – Curitiba, Brazil (transportation and land use combination)
 1964 Robert E. Simon – Reston, Virginia
 1966 Walt Disney – Experimental Prototype Community of Tomorrow (concept) (Note: While never built in the form Disney intended, Walt Disney World, where EPCOT was planned, houses an amusement park by the same name and is also near the Disney Company-founded town of Celebration, Florida.)
 1968 Agustín Landa Verdugo – Cancún, Mexico
 1970 Paolo Soleri – Arcosanti, Arizona, as well as his concept of arcologies
 1970 William Pereira, Ian McHarg – The Woodlands, Texas
 1972 Constantinos A. Doxiadis – Riyadh, Saudi Arabia
 1973 Moshe Safdie – Coldspring New Town, Baltimore
 1984 Andrés Duany, Elizabeth Plater-Zyberk – Seaside, Florida
 1990 Peter Calthorpe – Laguna West, California
 2003 Christopher Charles Benninger – Thimphu, Bhutan
 2011 V. P. Kulshrestha - Bhopal, India
 2018 Archimedes Muzenda - Harare, Zimbabwe

See also 
 List of urban theorists
 List of urban plans
 List of planned communities
 Urban planner
 Urban planning
 Distinguished Canadian Planners

References

External links 

 Individuals Who Influenced Planning Before 1978, from the American Planning Association
 

Urban planners
List